Qeshlaq-e Qabaleh Gah may refer to:
Qeshlaq-e Qabaleh Gah Abbas Ali
Qeshlaq-e Qabaleh Gah Ali Aslan
Qeshlaq-e Qabaleh Gah Allah Vardi va Paper
Qeshlaq-e Qabaleh Gah Gol Aslan